Home Video is an American electronic rock band from Brooklyn, New York. The group is composed of David Gross (keyboard/bass/sequencer) and Collin Ruffino (vocals/guitar), with live shows featuring drummer Jim Orso.

History
Originally from New Orleans, David Gross and Collin Ruffino began playing music under the name Home Video name when they both moved to New York City. It was there that they were discovered by Warp Records, who put out the band's first two releases in 2004, the That You Might 10 inch and the Citizen EP, which garnered the attention of such outlets as BBC Radio 1, NME and Rolling Stone. In 2006, Defend Music released the band's first full-length, No Certain Night or Morning, accompanying by a 12 inch for the single "Penguin," which included a remix by DFA Records's Tim Goldsworthy. From this album, DJ Sasha later picked two songs to remix for Invol2ver, which also included reworked songs from Ladytron, M83, and Apparat. Following this release, in 2009 the band released the It Will Be Ok EP. Outside of recording, the band has toured with Blonde Redhead, Colder, Yeasayer and has opened up for acts such as Justice, Flying Lotus, Radio 4 and Pinback. Additionally, the band has produced remixes for Bang Gang ("The World is Gray"), Modwheelmood ("Going Nowhere") and Faunts ("Explain").

Following their debut, they released sophomore album The Automatic Process in 2010, featuring 3 of the tracks from the It Will Be Ok EP. This album featured a shift to more beat heavy music, featuring pop elements while maintaining the band's characteristic minimalism and chilling atmosphere. The band followed this release with an EP titled A Quiet Place, written largely about Hurricane Katrina and the devastation the band members felt for their home state. In 2014, the band released their 3rd LP Here In Weightless Fall, which featured a stronger, cleaner production and more emphasis on funk and R&B, often utilizing powerful bass lines, and less guitar than previous albums. The content has been said to be written about the loss of an important relationship in one's life.

Film and TV
Home Video's music have appeared in various film and TV programs throughout the years. This includes "Superluminal" in The OC, "You Will Know What To Do" in the season 3 opener of ABC's Private Practice, "Business Transaction" in Grey's Anatomy season 7 episode 2, as well as "I Can Make You Feel It" in the closing of Season 2 Episode 19 of Gossip Girl. In addition, several songs including "We," "Melon" and "Sleep Sweet" have been used in the hit series CSI. "Every Love That Ever Was" featured in season 3 episode 21 of 90210.
Their song, "That You Might", appeared in the 2006 video game, Driver Parallel Lines.

Discography
That You Might (Warp Records, 2004)
Citizen EP (Warp Records, 2004)
No Certain Night or Morning (Defend Music, 2006)
It Will Be Ok EP (Home Video, 2009)
The Automatic Process (2010)
 A Quiet Place EP (2011)
Here In Weightless Fall (2014)

Videos
 "Sleep Sweet"
 "I Can Make You Feel It"
 "Live at Mercury Lounge (New York City)"

References

External links

Facebook Page

Electronic music groups from New York (state)
Indie rock musical groups from New York (state)
Musical groups from Brooklyn